Al Harewood (June 3, 1923 – March 13, 2014) was an American jazz drummer and teacher, born in Brooklyn. As a musician Harewood worked with many jazz musicians including the J.J. Johnson/Kai Winding group, the Art Farmer/Gigi Grice band, David Amram, Betty Carter, and the Curtis Fuller-Benny Golson Sextet. He played on many jazz recordings under the leadership of Lou Donaldson, Horace Parlan, Ike Quebec, Dexter Gordon and Grant Green and had a long association with saxophonist Stanley Turrentine from 1959 onwards.

He died in March 2014 at the age of 90.

Discography
With Ahmed Abdul-Malik
Jazz Sahara (Riverside, 1958)
East Meets West (RCA Victor, 1960)
With Benny Carter
Cookin' at Carlos I (MusicMasters 1988 [1990])
With Betty Carter
Finally, Betty Carter (Roulette, 1969)
Round Midnight (Roulette, 1969)
With Lou Donaldson
Sonny Side Up (Blue Note, 1960)
Midnight Sun (Blue Note, 1960)
Lush Life (Blue Note, 1967)
With Booker Ervin
That's It! (Candid, 1961)
With Curtis Fuller
Two Bones (Blue Note, 1958)
Blues-ette (Savoy, 1959)
Blues-ette Part II (Savoy, 1993)
With Benny Golson
Gone with Golson (New Jazz, 1959)
With Dexter Gordon
Doin' Allright (Blue Note, 1961)
With Grant Green
Grantstand (Blue Note, 1961)
Remembering (Blue Note, 1961)
Idle Moments (Blue Note, 1964)
With Dodo Greene
My Hour of Need (Blue Note, 1962)
With Bobby Hutcherson
The Kicker (Blue Note, 1963 – released 1999)
With Dick Katz
In High Profile (Bee Hive, 1984)
With Horace Parlan
Movin' & Groovin' (Blue Note, 1960)
Us Three (Blue Note, 1960)
Speakin' My Piece (Blue Note, 1960)
Headin' South (Blue Note, 1960)
On the Spur of the Moment (Blue Note, 1961)
Up & Down (Blue Note, 1961)
Frank-ly Speaking (SteepleChase, 1977)
with Ike Quebec
Heavy Soul (Blue Note, 1961)
It Might as Well Be Spring (Blue Note, 1961)
With Dizzy Reece
Comin' On! (Blue Note, 1960)
With Buddy Tate and Al Grey
Just Jazz (Uptown, 1984)
With Stanley Turrentine
Look Out! (Blue Note, 1960)
Comin' Your Way (Blue Note, 1961)
Up at "Minton's" (Blue Note, 1961)
Jubilee Shout!!! (Blue Note, 1961–62)
Never Let Me Go (Blue Note, 1963)
A Chip Off the Old Block (Blue Note, 1963)
With Kai Winding
K + J.J. (Bethlehem, 1955) with J. J. Johnson
Rainy Day (Verve, 1965)

References

External links
All About Jazz interview with Al Harewood
Obituary in JazzTimes

1923 births
2014 deaths
African-American drummers
American jazz drummers
Musicians from Brooklyn
Jazz musicians from New York (state)
20th-century African-American people
21st-century African-American people